Genevieve Hillen Sanford (May 26, 1883 - 	August 15, 1966) was a clubwoman active in civic affairs.

Early life
Genevieve Hillen was born in Peoria, Illinois, on May 26, 1883, the daughter of Robert G. and Anna J. Hillen.

Career
Genevieve H. Sanford was president of Tuesday Club, Sacramento, California. For many years she was a member of the Ann Land Memorial Fund Commission, appointed by the Sacramento City Council. The bequest of the Ann Land Memorial Fund required the funds be invested by the City Treasurer and the proceeds paid out, under supervision of the City Council, to the benefit of destitute men, women and children of the city.

She was intensely interested in philanthropy and was the chairman of the Red Cross Home Service, Aberdeen.

She was a member of the Woman's Century Club in Seattle, the Grays Harbor Women's Club, the Review Club.

Personal life
Genevieve H. Sanford moved to Washington state in 1926 and lived at 954 N. Division Street, Aberdeen, Washington.

Genevieve Hillen married George Brownell Sanford. 

She died in Sacramento on August 15, 1966, and is buried at the East Lawn Memorial Park, Sacramento.

References

1883 births
1966 deaths
People from Peoria, Illinois
Clubwomen